Eris flava is a species of jumping spider. It is found in the eastern United States, Cuba, Jamaica, and Hispaniola. The male can be distinguished from Eris militaris by its band of white scales across the clypeus.

References

External links

 

Salticidae
Articles created by Qbugbot
Spiders described in 1888